And If I Was To Die In The Morning... Would I Still Be Sleeping With You is the first EP from the Canadian emo/alternative rock band, Your Favorite Enemies. For producing the album, the band founded their own label called Hopeful Tragedy Records in April 2007.

The EP was released on June 1, 2007, and includes five songs, including "Midnight's Crashing", which is downloadable at the Rock'n'Rights-page, their profiles at Reverbnation and PureVolume.

Track listing

Personnel 
 Alex Foster – vocals
 Miss Isabel – keyboard, backing vocals
 Jeff Beaulieu – guitar
 Sef Lemelin – guitar
 Ben Lemelin – bass guitar
 Charles "Moose" Allicy – drums

2007 debut EPs
Your Favorite Enemies albums